Daniella Marques Consentino (born 16 October 1979) is a Brazilian economist and administration graduate. She was part of the economic team of president Jair Bolsonaro until 29 June 2022, when she was nominated as chairwoman of the state-owned Caixa Econômica Federal. She became the bank's chairwoman on 5 July 2022, replacing Pedro Guimaraes.

References

1979 births
Living people
Brazilian economists
Pontifical Catholic University of Rio de Janeiro alumni
People from Barra Mansa